Matteo Pedrini (born 16 January 2000) is an Italian footballer who plays as a forward.

Club career
He played in the 2018–19 season in Serie D for Rezzato.

On 17 July 2019, he joined Serie C club Giana Erminio on a season-long loan.

He made his professional Serie C debut for Giana Erminio on 25 August 2019 in a game against Renate. He started the game and played 73 minutes. He scored his first professional goal in the next game on 1 September 2019 against Olbia.

On 31 August 2020, he joined Grosseto on loan. On 13 January 2021, he moved on a new loan to Bisceglie. On 13 July 2021, he was loaned to Mantova.

References

External links
 

2000 births
Living people
Footballers from Bergamo
Italian footballers
Association football forwards
Serie C players
Serie D players
Atalanta B.C. players
A.S. Giana Erminio players
U.S. Grosseto 1912 players
A.S. Bisceglie Calcio 1913 players
Mantova 1911 players
21st-century Italian people